The Men's 50 Breaststroke at the 10th FINA World Swimming Championships (25m) was swum 18 – 19 December in Dubai, United Arab Emirates. 92 individuals swam in the Preliminary heats on 18 December, with the top 16 finishers advancing to the Semifinals that evening. The top 8 finishers from the Semifinals then advanced to the Final the next evening.

At the start of the event, the existing World (WR) and Championship records (CR) were:

The following records were established during the competition:

Results

Heats

Semifinals
Semifinal 1

Semifinal 2

Final

References

Breaststroke 050 metre, Men's
World Short Course Swimming Championships